The Goshen Players is a community theatre in Goshen, Connecticut. They occupy the Old Town Hall, located at the rotary at the intersections of Routes 4 and 63. The Players are very proud to be the second oldest continuously performing theatre group in the state, Simsbury Light Opera being older by one year.

History
In 1949 the small group who gathered at the home of Dr. and Mrs. Albert Dolloff, wondering whether it would be possible to produce an operetta, probably did not consider that they were initiating a springtime tradition in Goshen. The first group, like the present cast, was composed of a few members with professional experience and a majority of amateurs with varying stage experience. Their presentation of Trial By Jury was such a success that they gave request performances in Cornwall, Litchfield, and West Torrington. Proceeds were divided between the Church of Christ, Congregational, and St. Thomas' Church, both of Goshen.

The future
The Goshen Players inaugurated their first full season in 2005 with a production of Blithe Spirit in the fall and Urinetown the Musical in the spring of 2006. They will be presenting Neil Simon's Rumors as their fall production of the 2006–2007 season. A staged reading of Tom Dudzick's comedy "Greetings!" was performed in November 2006.

References

External links

Official website

Theatre companies in Connecticut
Arts organizations established in 1949
Goshen, Connecticut
1949 establishments in Connecticut